White House Plumbers is an upcoming American political drama television miniseries created and written by Alex Gregory and Peter Huyck and directed by David Mandel, based on the 2007 book Integrity by Egil Krogh and Matthew Krogh. The series stars Woody Harrelson, Justin Theroux, Domhnall Gleeson, Kiernan Shipka, and Lena Headey and is set to premiere on HBO in March 2023.

Premise

Watergate masterminds and President Richard Nixon's political operatives E. Howard Hunt and G. Gordon Liddy, part of the "White House Plumbers" charged with plugging press leaks by any means necessary, accidentally overturn the Presidency they were trying to protect.

Cast and characters
 Woody Harrelson as E. Howard Hunt
 Justin Theroux as G. Gordon Liddy
 Domhnall Gleeson as John Dean
 Lena Headey as Dorothy Hunt
 Kiernan Shipka as Kevan Hunt
 Ike Barinholtz as Jeb Magruder
 Yul Vazquez as Bernard "Macho" Barker
 David Krumholtz as William O. Bittman
 Rich Sommer as Egil "Bud" Krogh
 Kim Coates as Frank Sturgis
 Liam James as Saint John Hunt
 Nelson Ascencio as Virgilio "Villo" Gonzalez
 Gary Cole as Mark Felt
 Toby Huss as James W. McCord Jr.
 Zoe Levin as Lisa Hunt
 John Carroll Lynch as John N. Mitchell
 Zak Orth as Alfred C. Baldwin III
 Tony Plana as Eugenio "Muscolito" Martinez
 F. Murray Abraham as Judge John Sirica
 Tre Ryder as David Hunt
 Kathleen Turner as Dita Beard
 Judy Greer as Fran Liddy
 Corbin Bernsen as Richard Kleindienst
 Alexis Valdés as Felipe De Diego
 J.P. Manoux as Robert Mardian

Production

Development
On December 4, 2019, it was announced that HBO had ordered the five-episode limited series created and executive produced by Alex Gregory, Peter Huyck, David Mandel, Frank Rich, Ruben Fleischer, and David Bernad. Gregory and Huyck were attached to write the miniseries with Mandel directing all episodes. The series is scheduled to premiere in March 2023.

Casting
Alongside the series order announcement, Woody Harrelson and Justin Theroux were set to star in lead roles as well as executive produce. In April 2021, Domhnall Gleeson and Lena Headey were cast in main roles. In May 2021, Kiernan Shipka, Ike Barinholtz, Yul Vazquez, David Krumholtz, Rich Sommer, Kim Coates, and Liam James joined the cast in starring roles while Nelson Ascencio, Gary Cole, Toby Huss, Zoe Levin, John Carroll Lynch, Zak Orth, and Tony Plana were cast in undisclosed capacities. In the same month, the following week, Kathleen Turner joined the main cast. In June 2021, Judy Greer was cast in a main role. In July 2021, Corbin Bernsen and Alexis Valdés were cast in undisclosed capacities.

Filming
The series began principal photography on May 3, 2021, and ended on October 21, 2021. Filming took place in Poughkeepsie, New York on Zack's Way, New York City, Albany, New York, Washington, D.C., Charlotte Amalie, U.S. Virgin Islands, Beverly Hills, California, and Redondo Beach, California. On August 5, 2021, production was suspended after an audio recording reportedly captured Mandel berating and threatening the head of props, and the props department walked off the set. Filming resumed on August 12 with additional protocols following the incident.

References

External links
 
 

American political drama television series
American television miniseries
English-language television shows
HBO original programming
Television series based on actual events
Television series by Home Box Office
Television shows based on non-fiction books
Television shows filmed in New York City
Upcoming drama television series
Works about the Watergate scandal